Skinmo is a village in Larvik municipality, Norway. Before 1988, it was a part of Hedrum municipality.

The village Skinmo is located in the eastern part of the municipality. For statistical purposes it is considered a part of the urban settlement Sandefjord, which covers the greater Sandefjord city area and stretches towards Stokke and into peripheral parts of Larvik municipality. The urban settlement Sandefjord has a population of 39,849, of which 705 people live within Larvik.

References

Villages in Vestfold og Telemark